UC3 may refer to:

 , a private Danish submarine
 , a German submarine of World War One
 German Type UC III submarine, a World War One class of submarine
 UC 3 (album)

See also
 UC (disambiguation)
 UCCC (disambiguation)